The C. P. Ramaswami Aiyar Foundation is a non-profit organization founded on 14 October 1966 as per the will of lawyer C. P. Ramaswami Iyer. The foundation is headquartered a1 1, Eldam's Road, Alwarpet in Chennai, India (also known as C. P. Ramaswami Road) on the property known as "The Grove" which belongs to the C. P. Ramaswami Iyer family. The President of the foundation (in 2015) was Nanditha Krishna, a member of the family.

Activities
The foundation runs several institutions that contribute to society in the fields of education, culture and social work. These include:
 The C. P. Ramaswami Aiyar Institute of Indological Studies. Affiliated to Madras University, this institute is a recognized center for earning a Ph.D. in Indological studies
 The C. P. Ramaswami Aiyar Environmental Education Centre, a Centre of Excellence of the Ministry of Environment, Forests and Climate Change, Govt. of India.
 The Saraswathi Kendra Learning Centre for Children, a learning centre for children with disabilities in Chennai
The Shakunthala Jagannathan Museum of Folk Art in Kanchipuram
 The C. P. Ramaswami Aiyar art centre
The Grove School in Chennai
The Rangammal Vidyalaya school for Girls in Kanchipuram
The Sir C. P. Ramaswami Aiyar Memorial School in Kumbakonam.

References 

Non-profit organisations based in India